Byobu is an enhancement for the GNU Screen terminal multiplexer or tmux used with the Linux computer operating system that can be  used to provide on-screen notification or status, and tabbed multi-window management.  It is intended to improve terminal sessions when users connect to remote servers.

History
Version 1.0, under the name Screen Profiles, came out of discussions at the 2008 Ubuntu Developer Summit about how to simplify the on screen notification of an administrator connected to a server.

The project was renamed to Byobu for its 2.0 release, from the Japanese byōbu folding screen.  Byobu 3.0 reworked the build system to use automake and allow for porting to other Unix-like operating systems.  Byobu 4.0 introduced screen splitting, reworked the status notification system, and added support for tmux profiles. The most significant change that Byobu 5.0 introduces is a shift from GNU Screen to tmux as the default backend.

Originally written for Ubuntu, it has since been ported to multiple other Linux distributions and other Unix-like operating systems.

References

External links
 
 Ubuntu Manpage
 Project home
 How To Install and Use Byobu for Terminal Management on Ubuntu 16.04, Stephen Rees-Carter, digitalocean.com, August 4, 2016
 Byobu: Like Screen, but Better, Juliet Kemp, ServerWatch, October 4, 2010
 Use byobu for extended features in your terminal window,  Jack Wallen, ghacks.net, November 16, 2010

Free system software
Terminal multiplexers